Mohammad Ali bin Haji Momin (born 6 February 1973) is a retired Bruneian footballer. Once a household name in Brunei as part of the Brunei M-League representative team playing as a midfielder, he is currently the team manager of Brunei's sole professional side Brunei DPMM FC.

Ali was a squad member of the Brunei team playing in the Malaysian leagues in the mid-to-late-1990s. His last season for the team was in 1999 when Brunei won the Malaysian Cup. He then played for DPMM FC, a team founded by Prince Al-Muhtadee Billah where he is one of its founding members. He stayed on with DPMM as the general manager after his retirement.

International career
Ali played every match for the national team at the 20th SEA Games held in his country. He was also ever-present for Brunei at the 2000 AFC Asian Cup qualification round and the 2002 World Cup qualifying.

Honours

Team 
Brunei FA
 Malaysia Cup: 1999

Individual
 
  Meritorious Service Medal (PJK) –  (1999)

References

External links

1973 births
Living people
Association football midfielders
Bruneian footballers
Brunei international footballers
DPMM FC players
Bruneian football managers
Brunei (Malaysia Premier League team) players
Competitors at the 1999 Southeast Asian Games
Southeast Asian Games competitors for Brunei